Pangtara was a Shan state in what is today the Pindaya Township of Burma. It belonged to the Myelat Division of the Southern Shan States.

References

External links
"Gazetteer of Upper Burma and the Shan states"
The Imperial Gazetteer of India

Shan States

ca:Pindaya